Peter William Willans (1851-1892) was an engineer and designer of steam engines, in particular the Willans engine.

Willans was a partner with Mark Robinson in the firm Willans & Robinson.

Willans is remembered for his development of the 'Willans line', which represents the relationship between fuel energy input and engine output.

Publications

References

Citations

Sources

 
 

 

1851 births
1892 deaths
English civil engineers
English mechanical engineers
English inventors
British steam engine engineers
Marine engine manufacturers